Pkai Dos Kuntuy is a 1968 Khmer film  directed by Nop Nem. The film stars Kong Som Eun and Kim Nova.

Cast 
Kong Som Eun
Kim Nova
Nop Nem
Saki Sbong
Rosanara
Or Dom

References 

1968 films
Khmer-language films
Cambodian drama films